Chewbacca Mask Lady (also known as Chewbacca Mom) is a viral video featuring 37-year-old Texan mother Candace Payne filming herself heartily laughing while wearing a Star Wars Chewbacca mask. The video was posted to Facebook with the description "It's the simple joys in life...." on May 19, 2016.

Reaction
The video became so popular that Forbes reported that the mask sold out from every online retailer. In response to the video, Kohl's, where the mask was purchased, rewarded Payne with about $2,500 in gift cards, Star Wars toys and 10,000 reward points. On May 23, 2016, Holly Willoughby and Phillip Schofield wore the masks on This Morning. On the same day, Payne was featured on Good Morning America. On the show, Hasbro rewarded her with more Star Wars toys. Later that day, The Gregory Brothers uploaded an autotuned remix of the video. Payne was later featured on The Late Late Show with James Corden with J. J. Abrams. She was also featured on "The Star Wars Show" on the Star Wars official YouTube channel on May 25, 2016. Additionally, Payne received $7,500 for a Memorial Day weekend visit at Disney's Hollywood Studios, $2,000 to attend the Fan Dallas Expo with Chewbacca actor Peter Mayhew, and $400,000 in scholarship money from Southeastern University, bringing the total value of her gift to more than $420,000 as of June 7, 2016.

On May 24, 2016, she was invited by Mark Zuckerberg to visit the Facebook headquarters in California. As of that date, the video had gathered over 140 million views on Facebook and was the most viewed Facebook Live video of all time. The video also has over three million Facebook "reshares".

Payne visited Hasbro headquarters with her family on June 19 and was presented with a "Chewbacca Mom" action figure. The body looks like Chewbacca but the head is a representation of Payne, including a removable Chewbacca mask; it also has 13 prerecorded phrases such as "That's not me making that noise, it's the mask," and "I am such a happy Chewbacca." Payne has since signed on as a video blogger with the television network TLC and written a book about her experience Laugh It Up!: Embrace Freedom and Experience Defiant Joy (2017). Payne is a graduate of Ouachita Baptist University.

Other videos
On July 9, 2016, Payne posted a video on Facebook of her cover of Michael Jackson's song "Heal the World" and dedicated it to the victims of the 2016 shooting of Dallas police officers, which happened days earlier in Dallas near her home. This video, and the widespread perception that it represented a misunderstanding of or a distraction from important issues, was the likely origin of the term milkshake duck, according to the term's creator.

In other media
The video was parodied in the 2018 Disney animated film Ralph Breaks the Internet, the sequel to 2012's Wreck-It Ralph. In the film, before Ralph and Vanellope meet her and while determining which videos must be on BuzzzTube, Yesss and her assistant Maybe see a video entitled "Chewbacca Dad", to which Maybe explains to his boss that it is Chewbacca, but a dad rather than a mom.

References

External links
Original video on Facebook

2016 in Texas
2016 works
Facebook
Masks in the Americas
Star Wars fandom
Viral videos
Internet memes introduced in 2016